The Karachi International Film Festival, simply known as the Kara Film Festival (Urdu: کارا فلم فیسٹیول or کارا فلم)   was founded in 2001 by the KaraFilm Society, reportedly in response to the declining state of the Pakistani film industry. The film festival was held annually until 2009. The 8th Kara Film Festival was supposed to be held in 2010 but has since been delayed every year due to the socio-economic problems that Karachi was facing.

The goal of the festival was to "promote an appreciation of the art and craft of filmmaking among a wide population as well as to encourage creativity and high standards among filmmakers". The Kara Film Festival was founded to celebrate the past galore of Pakistani cinema and help aid in its revival.

The festival featured a variety of independent films including documentaries, narrative features and shorts. From the 6th festival onwards there was also a family-friendly section of children's animated movies There would be a jury who would celebrate emerging and renowned filmmakers by awarding their works. One distinctive feature of the festival was that it would showcase works of art by Pakistani artists. Another feature of the festival was that the opening and closing ceremonies would feature some of the new as well as some of the famed Pakistani musical talent.

History
Cineaste One a similar institution which substituted KaraFilm by organizing COSFF and workshops with a greater focus on education, and substituting indie films with student films. Cineaste One while succeeding KaraFilm festival does not employ anyone involved with it.

Awards
A jury hands out awards to the films they deem the best at the closing ceremony.

Documentary Films
Best Documentary

Short films
Best Live Action Short Film
Best Animated Short Film
Best Telefilm

Feature films
Best Feature Film
Best Direction
Best Male Actor in a Leading Role
Best Female Actor in a Leading Role
Best Male Actor in a Supporting Role
Best Female Actor in a Supporting Role
Best Screenplay
Best Editing
Best Cinematography
Best Musical Score

Jury Awards
Special Jury Award
Special Jury Award for Acting

See also 
 Cineaste One Student Film Festival
 Cinema in Karachi
 Cinema of Pakistan
 Festivals in Karachi

References

External links

Sixth KaraFilm Festival (7-17 December 2006) - Dawn Review
Kara Shorts - A Review by Bollywood Movie Review
Ayers Baxter on Kara Film Festival 2004

Film festivals in Pakistan
Festivals in Karachi
Kariwood
Cinema of Sindh
Short film festivals